Ron Duffy (born Ronald Harold George) is a New Zealand former professional rugby league footballer. He represented New Zealand, playing for "the Kiwis" in 1961 in two international tests.

Early life
Duffy spent his childhood in Auckland. He was educated at St Peter's College.

League career
He played in two tests, one against Great Britain and one against France.

References

Living people
New Zealand people of Irish descent
People educated at St Peter's College, Auckland
Rugby league players from Auckland
New Zealand rugby league players
New Zealand national rugby league team players
Auckland rugby league team players
Year of birth missing (living people)